Joel Zifkin (born April 14, 1954) is a Canadian musician and songwriter. His primary instrument is the electric violin and he is best known as a session musician and live performer.

Career 
Zifkin has performed and/or recorded with the following artists: Kate & Anna McGarrigle, Richard Thompson, Rufus Wainwright, Martha Wainwright, Emmylou Harris, Buddy Guy, Big Mama Thornton, Eddie "Cleanhead" Vinson, Philip Glass, Lou Reed, Townes Van Zandt, Rational Youth, Joe Dassin, Roma Baran, Elvis Costello, Wade Hemsworth, Pierre Marchand, Robert Charlebois, Les Colocs, Yaya Diallo, Chaim Tannenbaum, Joe Boyd, The Chieftains, Pat Donaldson, Ravens & Chimes, Hal Willner's Harry Smith Project: Anthology of American Folk Music Revisited, among others.

He also appeared in the film Hank Williams: The Show He Never Gave (1980) and the documentary "Sing Me the Songs That Say I Love You: A Concert for Kate McGarrigle", directed by Lian Lunson (2013).

Zifkin released the self-titled solo album Joel Zifkin in 2004, Five Songs More in 2008, and the singles "When Insanity Reigns It Pours" and "The Glow" in 2013, all on iTunes.

Selected credits 

Solo
 Joel Zifkin (2004)
 Five Songs More (2008)

With Kate & Anna McGarrigle
 Heartbeats Accelerating (1990)
 "Was My Brother in the Battle?", "Hard Times Come Again No More", "Better Times Are Coming", on Songs of the Civil War (1991)
 Matapedia (1996)
 The McGarrigle Hour (1998)
 La vache qui pleure (2003)
 The McGarrigle Christmas Hour (2005)
 Before Tomorrow (French title Le jour avant le lendemain) film soundtrack (2008)
 ODDiTTiES (2010)
 Sing Me the Songs: Celebrating the Works of Kate McGarrigle (2013)

With World Café
 "DJ Serenade", on Live at the World Café - Volume 9 (1999)

With Richard Thompson
 Dream Attic (2010) (nominated for the Best Contemporary Folk Album award in the 53rd Annual Grammy Awards. )
 Live at Celtic Connections – The Richard Thompson Band (2012) DVD, Blu-ray Disc

With Rufus Wainwright
 Moulin Rouge! Music from Baz Luhrmann's Film (2001)
 When Love Speaks (2002)
 Vibrate: The Best of Rufus Wainwright (2014)

With The Wainwright Sisters
 Songs in the Dark (2015)

With Les Colocs
 Les Colocs (1993)
 Suite 2116 (posthumous; 2001)
 Il me parle de bonheur (2009)

See also
 Kate & Anna McGarrigle
 Les Colocs
 Richard Thompson

References

External links
 "Meet Joel Zifkin" bio and interview on Richard Thompson's Beesweb site
 Allmusic Selected Discography
 Joel Zifkin's official Facebook Page

1954 births
Living people
Canadian rock violinists
Canadian male violinists and fiddlers
Anglophone Quebec people
Francophone Quebec people
Musicians from Montreal
Canadian male singer-songwriters
Kate & Anna McGarrigle
Canadian folk violinists
21st-century Canadian violinists and fiddlers